Chanice Porter (born 25 May 1994) is a Jamaican track and field athlete who specializes in long jump. She represented Jamaica at the 2019 World Athletics Championships, competing in women's long jump.

She has qualified to represent Jamaica at the 2020 Summer Olympics.

High School Career
An athletic standout at Manchester High School, she competed primarily in the high jump and long jump events at the junior level. However as a class four athlete, she finished sixth in the 100 metre dash.  

At the 2008 ISSA Boys and Girls Champs, Porter earned fourth and sixth place finishes in the long jump and high jump respectively. These finishes were improved upon at the 2009 championships. Here, she earned a bronze medal in the high jump and silver in the long jump events in the Girls Class 3 category.  

She went on to set a meet record of 6.43 metres in the long jump event at the 2010 championships.  

Porter earned silver medals in the Class 2 high jump and long jump events at the 2011 staging of the championships. She completed her high school career by earning gold medal finishes in both the Class 1 high jump and long jump. She posted new meet records of 1.86 metres and 6.52 metres respectively, erasing the previous high jump record which had stood for 9 years prior.

References

External links

Jamaican female long jumpers
1994 births
Living people
World Athletics Championships athletes for Jamaica
Athletes (track and field) at the 2020 Summer Olympics
Olympic athletes of Jamaica
20th-century Jamaican women
21st-century Jamaican women